The 2008 Absa Currie Cup First Division season was contested from 27 June through to 10 October. The Currie Cup is an annual domestic competition for provincial rugby union teams in South Africa.

History
 The Absa Currie Cup First Division, as it is today known, is the ninth season of the competition.
 The competition was first contested in 2000 when it was known as the Bankfin Cup and played alongside the Bankfin Currie Cup. It later became known as the Absa Cup and, from 2004, the Absa Currie Cup First Division.
 The first winners of the competition were the Vodacom Blue Bulls who, just two seasons later, would go on to win the Absa Currie Cup title three years in succession.
 Boland Kavaliers have won the title three times.
 Boland Kavaliers and the Platinum Leopards have met in the final three times – 2001, 2003 and 2006 – with the Platinum Leopards winning all three matches.

No of First Division titles

Overview
The winner of the final plays against the team that are at the bottom of the Absa Currie Cup Premier Division standings and the runner-up plays the 2nd last team on the log for a chance to be promoted to the Premier Division.  The SWD Eagles won the final of the 2007 Currie Cup First Division 38 – 3 against the Mighty Elephants, and faced the Valke in the playoff matches. The Mighty Elephants faced the Boland Kavaliers in their two leg matches.

Teams
The SWD Eagles and the Mighty Elephants did not get promoted to the Premier Division. They both lost both their matches against the Valke and the Boland Kavaliers.

 The teams are listed in alphabetical order:
 Mighty Elephants from Port Elizabeth
 Border Bulldogs from East London
 Griffons from Welkom
 Platinum Leopards from Potchefstroom
 Pumas from Witbank
 SWD Eagles from George

Final standings

Updated 29 September 2008:

Points Breakdown
 Four points for a win
 Two points for a draw
 One bonus point for a loss by seven points or less
 One bonus point for scoring four or more tries in a match

Table Notes
 P = points
 W = Won
 D = Drawn
 L = Lost
 PF = points for
 P = Points Against
 PD = Points Difference (PF - PA)
 TF = Tries For
 TA = Tries Against
 BP = Bonus points
 Pts = Total Points

Fixtures and results

Compulsory Friendlies

Week One

! align=centre colspan=100| Bye
|- bgcolor="#FFFFFF"
| Platinum Leopards
| Border Bulldogs

Week Two

! align=centre colspan=100| Bye
|- bgcolor="#FFFFFF"
| Pumas
| SWD Eagles

Week Three

! align=centre colspan=100| Bye
|- bgcolor="#FFFFFF"
| Griffons
| Mighty Elephants

Week Four

Week Five

Week Six

Week Seven

Week Eight

! align=centre colspan=100| Bye
|- bgcolor="#FFFFFF"
| SWD Eagles
| Pumas

Week Nine

! align=centre colspan=100| Bye
|- bgcolor="#FFFFFF"
| Griffons
| Mighty Elephants

Week Ten

Week Eleven

Week Twelve

! align=centre colspan=100| Bye
|- bgcolor="#FFFFFF"
| Platinum Leopards
| Border Bulldogs

Knock Out Stage

Semi finals

Finals

Promotion/relegation

Round 1

Round 2

Promotion/relegation Table

Results
 Boland Kavaliers manage to stay in the Absa Currie Cup Premier Division.
 Platinum Leopards are promoted to the Absa Currie Cup Premier Division.
 The Griffons just lost out to the Boland Kavaliers to remain in the First Division.
 The Valke are relegated to the Absa Currie Cup First Division after losing both their matches against the Platinum Leopards.

Statistics

Top 5 point scorers

Top 5 try scorers

Disciplinary Records by Team

Top 5 Disciplinary Records by Player

References

 Currie Cup
 2008 Currie Cup Premier Division
 ABSA

External links
 

2008
2008 Currie Cup